Dunkeswick is a hamlet in Harrogate District, North Yorkshire, just north of the River Wharfe, off the A61, around a kilometre north of Harewood and two kilometres south of Kirkby Overblow.

Etymology
The name of Dunkeswick comes from the Old English words cēse ('cheese') and wīc ('dwelling, specialised farm'), and thus once meant 'farm specialising in cheese production'. The fact that keswick begins with [-] rather than the [] sound of cheese, however, reflects the influence of Old Norse pronunciation on the local language. The additional element Dun seems to have been added to distinguish the settlement from other places called Keswick, such as the nearby East Keswick.

History
The war memorial from Dunkeswick Methodist Chapel was housed in Harewood Methodist Chapel after the closure of Dunkeswick chapel. Harewood Methodist Chapel has since closed.

Dunkewsick Moor is noted as the site of the Knight Air Flight 816 crash in 1995. On 24 May 1995, this scheduled flight from Leeds Bradford Airport to Aberdeen crashed shortly after take off, with the loss of all 12 passengers and crew on board.

References

Hamlets in North Yorkshire